Little Fish is a novel by Casey Plett, published May 1, 2018 by Arsenal Pulp Press. The book won the Lambda Literary Award for Transgender Fiction in 2018.

Reception 
Booklist's Michael Cart provided a positive review, stating, "Plett writes extremely well, creating a mood and tone that match Wendy’s dark emotions and uncertainties. This character-driven novel is a welcome addition to the slender body of transgender fiction."

The Globe and Mail named Little Fish one of the best 100 books of the year.

References 

Arsenal Pulp Press books
2018 Canadian novels
2018 LGBT-related literary works
2010s LGBT novels
Novels set in Manitoba
Novels with transgender themes
Novels about prostitution